Orpecacantha is a genus of moths in the family Autostichidae.

Species
Orpecacantha afghana Gozmány, 2008
Orpecacantha aphrodite (Gozmány, 1986)
Orpecacantha burmanni (Gozmány, 1962)
Orpecacantha capnoptera Gozmány, 2008
Orpecacantha multispina Gozmány, 2008
Orpecacantha opacogramma Gozmány, 2008
Orpecacantha oxydata Gozmány, 2008
Orpecacantha pardalis Gozmány, 2008
Orpecacantha singularis Gozmány, 2008

References

 
Moth genera
Symmocinae